Foynøya is an island off the coast of Nordaustlandet, Svalbard. The island is named after whaling pioneer Svend Foyn. Previous names include Walrus Eyland, Föyen's Island and Foyn Island.

The island is part of the Nordaust-Svalbard Nature Reserve.

References

Islands of Svalbard